CD59 glycoprotein, also known as MAC-inhibitory protein (MAC-IP), membrane inhibitor of reactive lysis (MIRL), or protectin,  is a protein that in humans is encoded by the CD59 gene. It is an LU domain and belongs to the LY6/uPAR/alpha-neurotoxin protein family.

CD59 attaches to host cells via a glycophosphatidylinositol (GPI) anchor.  When complement activation leads to deposition of C5b678 on host cells, CD59 can prevent C9 from polymerizing and forming the complement membrane attack complex. It may also signal the cell to perform active measures such as endocytosis of the CD59-C9 complex.

Mutations affecting GPI that reduce expression of CD59 and decay-accelerating factor on red blood cells result in paroxysmal nocturnal hemoglobinuria.

Viruses such as HIV, human cytomegalovirus and vaccinia incorporate host cell CD59 into their own viral envelope to prevent lysis by complement.

References

Further reading

External links

 
 

Clusters of differentiation
Blood antigen systems
Transfusion medicine